A graph neural network (GNN) is a class of artificial neural networks for processing data that can be represented as graphs. 

In the more general subject of "geometric deep learning", certain existing neural network architectures can be interpreted as GNNs operating on suitably defined graphs. Convolutional neural networks, in the context of computer vision, can be seen as a GNN applied to graphs structured as grids of pixels. Transformers, in the context of natural language processing, can be seen as GNNs applied to complete graphs whose nodes are words in a sentence.

The key design element of GNNs is the use of pairwise message passing, such that graph nodes iteratively update their representations by exchanging information with their neighbors. Since their inception, several different GNN architectures have been proposed, which implement different flavors of message passing, started by recursive or convolutional constructive approaches. , whether it is possible to define GNN architectures "going beyond" message passing, or if every GNN can be built on message passing over suitably defined graphs, is an open research question.

Relevant application domains for GNNs include social networks, citation networks, molecular biology, chemistry, physics and NP-hard combinatorial optimization problems.

Several open source libraries implementing graph neural networks are available, such as PyTorch Geometric (PyTorch), TensorFlow GNN (TensorFlow), and jraph (Google JAX).

Architecture 

The architecture of a generic GNN implements the following fundamental layers:
 Permutation equivariant: a permutation equivariant layer maps a representation of a graph into an updated representation of the same graph. In the literature, permutation equivariant layers are implemented via pairwise message passing between graph nodes. Intuitively, in a message passing layer, nodes update their representations by aggregating the messages received from their immediate neighbours. As such, each message passing layer increases the receptive field of the GNN by one hop.
 Local pooling: a local pooling layer coarsens the graph via downsampling. Local pooling is used to increase the receptive field of a GNN, in a similar fashion to pooling layers in convolutional neural networks. Examples include k-nearest neighbours pooling, top-k pooling, and self-attention pooling.
 Global pooling: a global pooling layer, also known as readout layer, provides fixed-size representation of the whole graph. The global pooling layer must be permutation invariant, such that permutations in the ordering of graph nodes and edges do not alter the final output. Examples include element-wise sum, mean or maximum.

It has been demonstrated that GNNs cannot be more expressive than the Weisfeiler–Lehman Graph Isomorphism Test. In practice, this means that there exist different graph structures (e.g., molecules with the same atoms but different bonds) that cannot be distinguished by GNNs. More powerful GNNs operating on higher-dimension geometries such as simplicial complexes can be designed. , whether or not future architectures will overcome the message passing primitive is an open research question.

Message passing layers 

Message passing layers are permutation-equivariant layers mapping a graph into an updated representation of the same graph. Formally, they can be expressed as message passing neural networks (MPNNs).

Let  be the neighbourhood of some node . Additionally, let  be the features of node , and  be the features of edge . An MPNN layer can be expressed as follows:

Intuitively, in an MPNN computational block, graph nodes update their representations by aggregating the messages received from their neighbours.

The outputs of one or more MPNN layers are node representations  for each node  in the graph. Node representations can be employed for any downstream task, such as node/graph classification or edge prediction.

Graph nodes in an MPNN update their representation aggregating information from their immediate neighbours. As such, stacking  MPNN layers means that one node will be able to communicate with nodes that are at most  "hops" away. In principle, to ensure that every node receives information from every other node, one would need to stack a number of MPNN layers equal to the graph diameter. However, stacking many MPNN layers may cause issues such as oversmoothing and oversquashing. Oversmoothing refers to the issue of node representations becoming indistinguishable. Oversquashing refers to the bottleneck that is created by squeezing long-range dependencies into fixed-size representations. Countermeasures such as skip connections (as in residual neural networks), gated update rules and jumping knowledge can mitigate oversmoothing. Modifying the final layer to be a fully-adjacent layer, i.e., by considering the graph as a complete graph, can mitigate oversquashing in problems where long-range dependencies are required.

Other "flavours" of MPNN have been developed in the literature, such as graph convolutional networks and graph attention networks, whose definitions can be expressed in terms of the MPNN formalism.

Graph convolutional network 
The graph convolutional network (GCN) was first introduced by Thomas Kipf and Max Welling in 2017.

A GCN layer defines a first-order approximation of a localized spectral filter on graphs. GCNs can be understood as a generalization of convolutional neural networks to graph-structured data.

The formal expression of a GCN layer reads as follows:

A limitation of GCNs is that they do not allow multidimensional edge features . It is however possible to associate scalar weights  to each edge by imposing , i.e., by setting each nonzero entry in the adjacency matrix equal to the weight of the corresponding edge.

Graph attention network 
The graph attention network (GAT) was introduced by Petar Veličković et al. in 2018.

Graph attention network is a combination of a graph neural network and an attention layer.
The implementation of attention layer in graphical neural networks helps provide attention or focus to the important information from the data instead of focusing on the whole data.

A multi-head GAT layer can be expressed as follows:

For the final GAT layer, the outputs from each attention head are averaged before the application of the activation function. Formally, the final GAT layer can be written as:

Attention in Machine Learning is a technique that mimics cognitive attention. In the context of learning on graphs, the attention coefficient  measures how important is node  to node .

Normalized attention coefficients are computed as follows:

Attention coefficients are normalized to make them easily comparable across different nodes.

A GCN can be seen as a special case of a GAT where attention coefficients are not learnable, but fixed and equal to the edge weights .

Gated graph sequence neural network 
The gated graph sequence neural network (GGS-NN) was introduced by Yujia Li et al. in 2015. The GGS-NN extends the GNN formulation by Scarselli et al. to output sequences. The message passing framework is implemented as an update rule to a gated recurrent unit (GRU) cell.

A GGS-NN can be expressed as follows:

where  denotes vector concatenation,  is a vector of zeros,  is a matrix of learnable parameters,  is a GRU cell, and  denotes the sequence index. In a GGS-NN, the node representations are regarded as the hidden states of a GRU cell. The initial node features  are zero-padded up to the hidden state dimension of the GRU cell. The same GRU cell is used for updating representations for each node.

Local pooling layers 
Local pooling layers coarsen the graph via downsampling. We present here several learnable local pooling strategies that have been proposed. For each cases, the input is the initial graph is represented by a matrix  of node features, and the graph adjacency matrix . The output is the new matrix of node features, and the new graph adjacency matrix .

Top-k pooling 
We first set 

where  is a learnable projection vector. The projection vector  computes a scalar projection value for each graph node.

The top-k pooling layer  can then be formalised as follows:

In other words, the nodes with the top-k highest projection scores are retained in the new adjacency matrix . The  operation makes the projection vector  trainable by backpropagation, which otherwise would produce discrete outputs.

Self-attention pooling 
We first set

where  is a generic permutation equivariant GNN layer (e.g., GCN, GAT, MPNN).

The Self-attention pooling layer  can then be formalised as follows:

where  is the subset of nodes with the top-k highest projection scores,  denotes element-wise matrix multiplication. 

The self-attention pooling layer can be seen as an extension of the top-k pooling layer. Differently from top-k pooling, the self-attention scores computed in self-attention pooling account both for the graph features and the graph topology.

Applications

Protein folding 

Graph neural networks are one of the main building blocks of AlphaFold, an artificial intelligence program developed by Google's DeepMind for solving the protein folding problem in biology. AlphaFold achieved first place in several CASP competitions.

Social networks 

Social networks are a major application domain for GNNs due to their natural representation as social graphs. GNNs are used to develop recommender systems based on both social relations and item relations.

Combinatorial optimization 

GNNs are used as fundamental building blocks for several combinatorial optimization algorithms. Examples include computing shortest paths or Eulerian circuits for a given graph, deriving chip placements superior or competitive to handcrafted human solutions, and improving expert-designed branching rules in branch and bound.

Cyber security 

When viewed as a graph, a network of computers can be analyzed with GNNs for anomaly detection. Anomalies within provenance graphs often correlate to malicious activity within the network. GNNs have been used to identify these anomalies on individual nodes and within paths to detect malicious processes, or on the edge level to detect lateral movement.

References

External Link 
https://distill.pub/2021/gnn-intro/
Semisupervised learning
Supervised learning
Unsupervised learning
Artificial neural networks
Graph algorithms